Guzmania foetida is a species of plant in the family Bromeliaceae. It is endemic to Ecuador.  Its natural habitat is subtropical or tropical moist montane forests. It is threatened by habitat loss.

References

foetida
Endemic flora of Ecuador
Near threatened plants
Taxonomy articles created by Polbot